Paul Jaeckel (born 22 July 1998) is a German professional footballer who plays as a centre-back for Bundesliga club Union Berlin.

Career
On 30 August 2018, Jaeckel joined 2. Bundesliga side SpVgg Greuther Fürth on a three-year contract.

References

External links
 

1998 births
Living people
Sportspeople from Eisenhüttenstadt
Footballers from Brandenburg
German footballers
Association football central defenders
Germany youth international footballers
Germany under-21 international footballers
FC Energie Cottbus players
VfL Wolfsburg II players
VfL Wolfsburg players
SpVgg Greuther Fürth players
SpVgg Greuther Fürth II players
1. FC Union Berlin players
Bundesliga players
Regionalliga players
2. Bundesliga players